"Just to Feel That Way" is the first single from Taylor Hicks' major label debut album Taylor Hicks, released by Arista Records. It was written by Lindy Robbins, Jess Cates and Emanuel Kiriakou, and produced by Matt Serletic. It was officially released to radio on February 5, 2007, nearly two months after the album. Hicks said that fan reaction contributed to releasing it as a single instead of "The Runaround", as originally planned. The video starts with a black-and-white vision, then shows Hicks performing with the band.

Chart performance

External links
Song lyrics and guitar chords
Billboard single review

References

2006 songs
2007 singles
Taylor Hicks songs
Songs written by Lindy Robbins
Songs written by Jess Cates
Songs written by Emanuel Kiriakou
Song recordings produced by Matt Serletic